Marie Jean Laing, Ph.D.; R.Phsych (born July 30, 1937) was a member of the Legislative Assembly of Alberta from 1986 to 1993.

Political career
Laing represented the now-defunct southeast Edmonton riding of Edmonton-Avonmore for the Alberta New Democrats. She currently teaches psychiatry at the University of Alberta in Edmonton. Before her election she had served as the Executive Director of the Edmonton Sexual Assault Centre

Laing was narrowly elected in an upset during the 1986 election by just 93 votes defeating the PC incumbent Horst Schmid. She was part of a sweep of many Edmonton ridings by New Democrats.

As an MLA, she was noted, along with other New Democrats, for introducing feminist causes in the Legislature. She was re-elected in the 1989 Alberta general election by a wider margin, but was defeated by Gene Zwozdesky in the 1993 Alberta general election.

After her time as an MLA, she began teaching and became the Executive Director of the WORTH Centre, which assisted women with addictions. She was published in journals dealing with Family Law, including her 1999 article For the Sake of the Children: Preventing Reckless New Laws.

References

Living people
Alberta New Democratic Party MLAs
Women MLAs in Alberta
People from the County of Stettler No. 6
1937 births